Stoyan Ormandzhiev (10 January 1920 – 10 October 2006) was a Bulgarian footballer and manager, who managed two European clubs and the Bulgaria national team during his career.

Sources
 

FC Lokomotiv 1929 Sofia players
First Professional Football League (Bulgaria) players
PFC CSKA Sofia managers
Bulgarian footballers
Sportspeople from Varna, Bulgaria
Association football defenders
Bulgarian football managers
PFC Cherno More Varna managers
Bulgaria national football team managers
1920 births
2006 deaths
DSV Leoben managers
Olympic bronze medalists for Bulgaria
Olympic medalists in football